Feher, or more properly Fehér, is a surname of Hungarian origin, meaning white. Bearers of the name include the following:

Csaba Fehér (born 1975), Hungarian footballer
Emily Feher (born 1985), American water polo player
Friedrich Feher
George Feher (born 1924), American physicist
György Fehér (1939–2002), Hungarian film director and screenwriter
Ilona Feher (1901-1988), Hungarian/Israeli violinist
Klára Fehér
Marius Feher
Michel Feher
Miklós Fehér (1979–2004), Hungarian footballer
Sandy Feher, Hungarian-American footballer
Norbert Feher (born 1981), Serbian criminal
Zoltán Fehér (born 1981), Hungarian footballer
Zsolt Fehér (born 1975), Hungarian footballer 
Zsolt Fehér (footballer born 1985), Hungarian footballer

Places 
Fehér County, the Hungarian name for Alba County, Romania
Fehér County (former) a former county of the Kingdom of Hungary and (Grand) Principality of Transylvania, now in Romania

References

Hungarian words and phrases
Hungarian-language surnames
Jewish surnames